Stabbing Westward is the fourth studio album by the American industrial rock band Stabbing Westward. It is their first album to be produced by Ed Buller and released on Koch Records. The album was released on May 22, 2001. The album shows a change in direction for the band. The album's songs are much less heavy and aggressive, while the industrial focus has given way to a more melodic sound. Before the album was released, lead singer Christopher Hall said in an interview that Stabbing Westward wrote great pop-rock songs, but the band had always ended up making them ugly by adding effects and screaming, etc. On this album, he claimed, they decided to write what they wanted, regardless of fan expectation. "The Only Thing" is a love song for Christopher Hall's wife.

The album did well in Australia, but ultimately failed to sell worldwide.

Track listing 

There is a US release that was a Best Buy exclusive. This package contains a bonus disk featuring previously unreleased acoustic versions of "So Far Away" and "Wasted". On the second disk, there is a misprint: it says "Perfect" instead of "Wasted". This two-disc set was only available at Best Buy stores in 2001 and only during the first week of its release.

Personnel 
Stabbing Westward
 Christopher Hall – vocals
 Derrek Hawkins – guitar, acoustic guitar
 Jim Sellers – bass, baritone guitar
 Walter Flakus – keyboards, synthesizer, programming
 Andy Kubiszewski – drums, vibraphone, marimba, synthesizer, acoustic guitar

Additional
 Ed Buller – production, engineer
 Kent Matcke – editing, engineer
 Enrique Gonzales – editing, assistant engineer
 Howie Weinberg – mastering
 Tom Lord-Alge – mixing
 Matthew Welch – photography
 Paul McMenamin – art direction, design, artwork (CD package)
 Scott Rivera – artwork (design assistance)

Charts

References 

2001 albums
Albums produced by Ed Buller
E1 Music albums
Stabbing Westward albums